Girls About Town may refer to:

 Girls About Town (EP), a 1980 EP by The Smithereens
 Girls About Town (film), a 1931 comedy film directed by George Cukor

See also
 Girl About Town, 1948-1949 American TV series
 Girls Town (disambiguation), films
 "Girls in our Town", 1976 song
 Small Town Girl (disambiguation)
 Three Girls About Town, 1941 film